Suzanne Venker (born 1968 in St. Louis, Missouri), is an American non-fiction author and radio host at KXFN. She has authored several anti-feminist books.

She co-wrote The Flipside of Feminism: What Conservative Women Know – and Men Can't Say with her late aunt, the conservative lawyer and activist Phyllis Schlafly.

Selected works
 
Review:

References

External links
 Official website.



American non-fiction writers
Boston University alumni
Female critics of feminism
Living people
Men's rights activists

1968 births